In cryptography, CS-Cipher (for Chiffrement Symétrique) is a block cipher invented by Jacques Stern and Serge Vaudenay in 1998. It was submitted to the NESSIE project, but was not selected.

The algorithm uses a key length between 0 and 128 bits (length must be a multiple of 8 bits). By default, the cipher uses 128 bits. It operates on blocks of 64 bits using an 8-round Feistel network and is optimized for 8-bit processors. The round function is based on the fast Fourier transform and uses the binary expansion of e as a source of "nothing up my sleeve numbers".

References
 

Feistel ciphers